Shizuoka Blue Revs (formerly the Yamaha Júbilo) are a rugby union team based in Iwata, Shizuoka, Japan. The team came second behind Toshiba Brave Lupus in the second season of Japanese rugby's Top League (2004–05). They were coached by former All Black Grant Batty and Fijian player-coach Tabai Matson. Founded in 1984, its name was "Yamaha Motors Rugby Football Club". The team rebranded as the Shizuoka Blue Revs ahead of the rebranding of the Top League to the Japan Rugby League One in 2022.

The team name Júbilo means 'joy' in Portuguese, which has had a notable influence on the Japanese language. The name was also shared with the also Yamaha owned Júbilo Iwata from J,League

Current squad

The Shizuoka Blue Revs squad for the 2023 season is:

 * denotes players qualified to play for the Japan on dual nationality or residency grounds.

Notable former players

Wataru Murata (2001-08, 68 games) Scrum-half, Japanese International (2001-08, 41 caps)
Leon MacDonald (2004–05, 12 games) Fly-half, Allblack (2000–08, 56 caps)
Ryō Yamamura (2004-21, 211 games) Prop, Japanese international (2002-07, 39 caps)
Brendan Laney (2005-07, 23 games) Utility back, Scottish international (2001-04, 20 caps)
Ayumu Goromaru (2008-16, 2017-21, 150 games) Fullback, Japanese international (2005-15, 57 caps)
Male Sa'u (2008-18, 118 games) Centre, Japanese international (2013-16, 27 caps)
Mose Tuiali'i (2009-19, 125 games) Loose Forward, Allblack (2004-06, 9 caps)
Jerry Collins (2011–13, 13 games) Loose forward, Allblack (2001–07, 48 caps)
Siale Piutau (2012-17, 45 games) Centre, Tongan international (2011–19, 43 caps)
Koki Yamamoto (2013-21, 105 games) Prop, Japanese international (2016-, 7 caps)

Coaches 

 Kevin Schuler - Director of Rugby
 Tabai Matson - Player and Head Coach
 Takanobu Horikawa - coach
 Waisake Sotutu - backs coach, player
 Simon Kerr - forwards coach

References

External links
 Toshiba, Yamaha set to do battle in Microsoft Cup final - Japan Times, January 31, 2005
  Yamaha rugby home page (in Japanese)
 

Japan Rugby League One teams
Rugby clubs established in 1984
Júbilo Iwata
Sports teams in Shizuoka Prefecture
Yamaha Corporation
1984 establishments in Japan
Iwata, Shizuoka